Cristian Moreni (born 21 November 1972 in Asola) is an Italian former road racing cyclist who rode for Cofidis, le Crédit par Téléphone in the UCI ProTour.

Doping
Moreni tested positive for testosterone at the end of the 11th stage of the 2007 Tour de France, on 25 July 2007 (stage 16). He was arrested after stage 16 by French gendarmes. He pleaded guilty, and did not request that a second sample be tested. Subsequently, to his arrest, Cofidis withdrew from the Tour. Moreni was suspended for two years following the scandal.

In 2009, when his suspension ended, Moreni became the first cyclist to pay a fine of one year's salary to the UCI. Moreni wanted to return as a professional cyclist.

Tour de France participations
2002 - 66th overall
2006 - 44th overall; 8th points; 2nd, Stage 18
2007 - Disqualified, use of Testosterone

Major results

1999
 Stage win, Vuelta a España
2000
 Stage win, Giro d'Italia
2003
 Regio-Tour International, stage 1
 Giro del Veneto
2004
  Italian National Road Race Championship
 Route du Sud, stage 1
 46th, Summer Olympics Men's Road Race
2005
 Tour de l'Ain, stage 1
 7th, GP Ouest-France

See also
 List of doping cases in cycling
List of sportspeople sanctioned for doping offences

References

External links

1972 births
Living people
Cyclists from the Province of Mantua
Italian male cyclists
Italian Vuelta a España stage winners
Italian Giro d'Italia stage winners
Italian sportspeople in doping cases
Cyclists at the 2004 Summer Olympics
Olympic cyclists of Italy
Doping cases in cycling
People from Asola, Lombardy